The Avengers is a 1950 American swashbuckler film and adventure film directed by John H. Auer and starring John Carroll, Fernando Lamas, and Adele Mara. The picture was shot on location in Argentina.

Premise
In 17th-century colonial Argentina, while trying to find his father's murderer, the adventurer Francisco Suarez is confronted with Colonel Luis Corral, who tries to usurp the Governor's seat. The Colonel is supposed to marry Maria Moreno, with whom Suarez falls in love.

Cast 
 John Carroll  as Francisco Suarez/Don Careless 
 Roberto Airaldi as Colonel Luis Corral 
 Adele Mara as Maria Moreno
 Fernando Lamas as André LeBlanc
 Cecile Lezard as Pamela
 Mona Maris as Yvonne
 Juan Olaguivel as Sancho
 Vicente Padula as El Mocho/Hernandez 
 Jorge Villoldo as Don Rafael Moreno

Production 
The film was shot on location in Buenos Aires. Originally Dolores del Río was supposed to portray Maria Moreno, but she was replaced with Mara because of a dispute with Argentine First Lady Eva Perón, who was originally intended to appear in the film.

References

External links

1950 films
1950s historical adventure films
American swashbuckler films
Films based on American novels
Films shot in Argentina
Films set in the 17th century
Films based on works by Rex Beach
Films scored by Nathan Scott
American historical adventure films
American black-and-white films
Films set in the Spanish Empire
Films shot in Buenos Aires
Films set in Buenos Aires
1950s English-language films
1950s American films